Viñas is a municipality located in the province of Zamora, Castile and León, Spain. According to the 2004 census (INE), the municipality had a population of 259 inhabitants.

Town hall
Viñas is home to the town hall of 4 villages:
Viñas (84 inhabitants, INE 2020).
Ribas (39 inhabitants, INE 2020).
San Blas (31 inhabitants, INE 2020).
Vega de Nuez (13 inhabitants, INE 2020).

References

Municipalities of the Province of Zamora